Oakes is a district of Huddersfield, West Yorkshire, England.

Oakes was a location of the textile industry. Wellington Mills was constructed together with the local Baptist church, a school, and a public house in 1864. The large factories have now closed and are used for other purposes. Oakes Mills has been demolished in 2017 to make room for a supermarket.

Climate

See also
Listed buildings in Huddersfield (Lindley Ward)

References 

Areas of Huddersfield